William Peter Hjelte, better known by his gamer tag Leffen, is a Swedish professional fighting game player and streamer. Although mostly known as a Super Smash Bros. Melee player, he has also competed in Dragon Ball FighterZ, Guilty Gear Strive, and Super Smash Bros. Ultimate. In Melee, Hjelte plays the character Fox, and is considered one of the best players in the world, having been ranked as one of the top seven Melee players in the world every year since 2014. A 2021 list compiled by PGStats ranked Hjelte as the sixth greatest Melee player of all time.

A Super Smash Bros. competitive player since 2009, he rose to international success in 2014, becoming the first player to beat each of the "Five Gods of Melee" —Armada, Mew2King, Hungrybox, Mang0, and PPMD— in tournaments over the course of his career (a feat only accomplished since by Plup), earning him the nickname of "God Slayer". He has won many tournaments ranked as majors in his career, starting with the Swedish tournament B.E.A.S.T 4 in 2014, which saw him become the first person other than one of the Five Gods to win a major since 2008. Since then, some of his most notable tournament wins include the 2015 and 2019 editions of Super Smash Con, CEO 2015, and Evo 2018. Since Armada's retirement in 2018, Leffen has been considered the undisputed best Melee player in Europe.

Although recognized as one of the best players in Melee history and having a dedicated fan base, Leffen has also been considered one of the most controversial and polarizing players in Super Smash Bros. history, due in part to accusations of aggressive and anti-social behavior— which resulted in a temporary ban from the Swedish competitive Melee scene in 2013. As a result, he has been referred to as the "Villain of Super Smash Bros."

Career
Hjelte started playing Super Smash Bros. in 2009, when he was introduced to Super Smash Bros. Melee. He initially started as a Yoshi and Falco player before switching to Fox. Leffen feels that he made the gradual switch from Falco to Fox because he views Falco as requiring more discipline and Fox being more suited to his play style.

He placed 9th in the Swedish national tournament B.E.A.S.T 2 within his first year of playing Melee. Throughout 2014 Leffen began placing highly in tournaments and defeating the top five Melee players regularly. Prior to EVO 2014, Joe Cribari of Nintendo Enthusiast listed Leffen among the three "underdogs" with the greatest chance to win the tournament. He finished 9th at EVO 2014.

In VGBootCamp's Apex 2015 Salty Suite, Hjelte defeated Kashan "Chillin" Khan in a first-to-five set without dropping a single game. Because of this, Hjelte has the "rights" to use Fox's default color. Mang0 subsequently challenged Hjelte to a 1,000 money match if they were to face-off in the Apex Singles bracket. Hjelte would in turn beat Mango when they played in Winners' Semifinals. After defeating Mew2King at Apex 2015 in singles bracket, Hjelte has taken at least one set off each of the "five gods" of Melee. Hjelte ultimately finished third in Apex 2015 Melee singles.

On March 9, 2015, Hjelte was signed by Team SoloMid as its first player on their Super Smash Bros. division, as well as their first fighting game player. At CEO 2015 in Orlando, Florida, Leffen won his first American major, defeating Armada. He placed 5th at EVO 2015 later that year, despite being a favorite to win. He was upset by Panda Global's Plup who played Samus. Melee it on Me ranked Leffen as the 2nd best player in the world in their summer 2015 mid-season rankings. Leffen was barred from entering the United States just before The Big House 5 tournament because he was travelling on an Electronic System for Travel Authorization (ESTA) and employed by US-based Team SoloMid.

On February 16, 2016, Leffen became sponsored by Red Bull as an official Red Bull Athlete. As of 2018, he was no longer with Red Bull.

Visa issues and EVO 2018

On April 29, 2016, Leffen announced that his Form I-129 petition to obtain a visa had been denied by United States Citizenship and Immigration Services. On 4 May 2016 it was initially announced that Team SoloMid was able to secure a P1 Visa for Leffen so he can be able to attend US-based tournaments throughout July which includes EVO 2016 and that TSM was working on extending this visa for the long term. However, on July 14 Leffen announced that he had run into additional delays in the visa approval process and would miss EVO. Finally, on October 3, Leffen's visa was approved, allowing him to compete in US-based tournaments again, in time for The Big House 6. In August 2018, Leffen won Evo 2018, defeating Armada 3–0 in grand finals to claim the trophy.

Other games
Hjelte has competed in fighting games including Dragon Ball FighterZ, Ultra Street Fighter IV, Ultimate Marvel vs. Capcom 3, and The King of Fighters XIII. According to the PGRZ, Hjelte is considered the 28th best Dragon Ball FighterZ player of all time. In an interview with EventHubs prior to Apex 2015, he suggested he might play Guilty Gear Xrd on his Twitch stream after Apex 2015 concluded. As of the release of Guilty Gear Strive, Hjelte has been hosting online tournaments for the game, hosting the title's first major, the Big LEVO. At Evo 2022, Leffen placed 3rd out of 2,161 entrants in Guilty Gear Strive, making this the first time that a player has made Top 8 at EVO in both a Smash title as well as a traditional fighting game.

Personal life
Hjelte is Korean-Swedish; his mother is a native Swede from Sweden, while his father is Korean who was adopted from South Korea. Hjelte says his family does not regularly follow Korean cultural traditions.

Leffen stated in 2015 his goal is not to just be the best Super Smash Bros player, but the best fighting game player.

Controversies
Leffen is a controversial figure in the Super Smash Bros. community, where he has been accused of aggressive and toxic behavior, bullying, and poor sportsmanship, notably due to his tendency to target other players or figures of the community with insults or confrontational statements, both online and in real life; other accusations include spreading false rumors about other players, intimidating newcomers, and making fun of individuals' illnesses or disabilities. This earned him the nickname of "Villain of Super Smash Bros.". Over the years, part of the scene has frequently requested for Leffen to be banned from the community due to his behavior, claiming that the perceived lack of punishment came from his popularity with part of the fanbase, and fears of being harassed by Leffen and said fanbase if someone spoke out against him. A 2015 Kotaku article noted that "Leffen likes to shit talk and make fun of his opponents."

Leffen's behavior caused him to be banned from the entire Swedish tournament scene for much of 2013, as well as from the online forum Smashboards, on which he was active. One of the officials behind the tournament ban stated that this was due to heavy bullying and overall poor treatment of fellow players, spreading false rumors about other players stealing or taking illegal drugs, making fun of others' diseases and disabilities, poor sportsmanship, trying to push people out of the community, and being "extremely mean" to his partners in Doubles if they made mistakes.

Leffen, who openly admitted to hating Super Smash Bros. Ultimate and competing and streaming the game purely for money, published tweets in September 2020 in which he stated he would "rather flip burgers at  [than stream Ultimate] if it paid the same amount," and that streaming Ultimate was harder than working a minimum wage job. His posts went viral on Twitter, drawing criticism regarding the struggles faced by minimum wage workers; he later apologized for his tweet, but reiterated that he would rather work a minimum wage job.

In an April 2015 interview, Leffen justified his behavior by claiming he was trying to elevate the level of play on the Melee scene, stating "I actually do like the villain role. [Melee]'s very stagnant sometimes. Since everyone is friends, nobody is really pushing each other — you’re not going to try that hard to beat someone you're close with." Talking about Leffen's behavior in the Super Smash Bros. community, GENESIS owner Sheridan "Dr. Z" Zalewski stated in 2019 that "I hate to say it, but everyone who actually runs the community wants this [kind of behavior] to happen" due to the interest it creates from fans.

Awards and nominations

Notable tournament placings
Only Majors and Supermajors are listed.

Super Smash Bros. Melee

Project M

Super Smash Bros. for Wii U

Super Smash Bros. Ultimate

References

External links

Living people
People from Stockholm
Marvel vs. Capcom players
Super Smash Bros. Melee players
Street Fighter players
Fighting game players
Swedish esports players
Team SoloMid players
Swedish people of South Korean descent
1994 births
Red Bull people
Super Smash Bros. Ultimate players